The 2009 Côte d'Ivoire Premier Division season was the 49th edition of the top-tier competition of Côte d'Ivoire football. The season concluded on the 1 November 2009. ASEC Mimosas were crowned as the Champions for 22nd time in their history.

Teams

Table

External links
 rsssf
 Soccerway.com

Ligue 1 (Ivory Coast) seasons
1
Ivory
Ivory